Shawn Wesley Abner (born June 17, 1966) is an American former professional baseball outfielder who played in Major League Baseball (MLB) from 1987 to 1992 for the San Diego Padres, California Angels, and Chicago White Sox. In 392 career games, Abner had a batting average of .227 with 191 hits, 11 home runs, and 71 runs batted in. He is widely considered a draft bust.

The New York Mets drafted Abner with the first overall selection in the 1984 MLB draft.

Early life
Shawn Wesley Abner was born on June 17, 1966, in Hamilton, Ohio, to Ben Sr. and Carol. In middle school, Abner played American football as a running back, though in high school he switched positions to quarterback because his mother stated she did not want Abner to get hurt. Abner attended high school at Mechanicsburg Area High School in Mechanicsburg, Pennsylvania, where he played football and baseball as a center fielder. In 1981, in football, the Mechanicsburg Wildcats finished as runners up in the Capital Area Conference (CAC) to Red Land High School as Abner was named to the CAC all-star team, composed of the best players in the conference, as a defensive back. 

The Mets selected him first overall in the 1984 MLB draft. When Abner signed with the Mets, his $150,500 signing bonus was the highest in the history of baseball.

Professional career
Abner never played a big league game for the Mets. After moving slowly through the minor league system, he was traded after the 1986 season to the San Diego Padres as part of an eight-player swap that sent Kevin Mitchell west in exchange for Kevin McReynolds. He made his debut on September 8, 1987 in a loss to the Braves.  Abner entered in the top of the eighth inning as a pinch hitter for Lance McCullers and flied out to center field in his first major league at bat.

The light-hitting Abner played sparingly over the next five seasons for San Diego, used mostly as a reserve outfielder. He was traded to the California Angels in 1991 and signed by the Chicago White Sox in 1992. His season with the White Sox was probably his best, as he attained a .279 batting average over 97 games.

Abner injured his knee the following season playing basketball before a Triple-A game for the Omaha Royals, and never played in the majors again. He batted and threw right-handed. In 392 career games, Abner had a batting average of .227 with 191 hits, 11 home runs, and 71 runs batted in. Abner is widely-considered a draft bust.

Personal life
Abner married his high-school sweetheart Kris in October 1987 at A Little White Wedding Chapel in Las Vegas. During the MLB off-season, Abner enjoyed playing blackjack in casinos in Las Vegas. His son Seth "Scump" Abner is a professional Call of Duty player.

On August 28, 2019, Shawn was charged with animal cruelty for leaving his 14 year old husky alone at home, for over a month, resulting in the dog's death. Shawn failed to ask anyone to care for the dog while he was away. He pleaded guilty to felony aggravated animal cruelty and was sentenced in January 2020 to 4.5–23 months in prison.

References

External links

1966 births
Living people
Major League Baseball outfielders
Baseball players from Ohio
American expatriate baseball players in Canada
San Diego Padres players
California Angels players
Chicago White Sox players
Major League Baseball replacement players
Kingsport Mets players
Little Falls Mets players
Lynchburg Mets players
Jackson Mets players
Las Vegas Stars (baseball) players
Vancouver Canadians players
Omaha Royals players
Norfolk Tides players
Sportspeople from Hamilton, Ohio
People from Mechanicsburg, Pennsylvania
Baseball players from Pennsylvania
Prisoners and detainees of Pennsylvania
American sportspeople convicted of crimes
American people convicted of cruelty to animals